The Commercial Tavern is a pub at 142 Commercial Street, Spitalfields, Shoreditch, London E1.

It is a Grade II listed round-ended building of white brick with painted stucco dressings, erected in 1865  by Abraham Keymer, publican of the Norfolk Arms in nearby Bethnal Green.

Licence holders and residents
A variety of sources provide information about the licence holder at various points in time:

1865 – Abraham Keymer (Survey of London)

1866 – Abraham Keymer (Post Office Directory)

1869 – Abraham Keymer (Post Office Directory)

1873 – Abraham Keymer transferred the license to Thomas Hoare (East London Observer)

1875 – Charles Entwhistle (Post Office Directory)

1881 – James Blumson of Bethnal Green (Census) ... Blumson was 32yo and lived on site with his wife Rose Blumson of Spitalfields, 29yo, their daughter Rose, 8yo, and five employees: Alfred Narey of Shoreditch, 23yo; Phoebe Narey of Bethnal Green, 22yo; Daniel McCue of Hoxton, 30yo; Charles Bailey of Aberdeen, 23yo; Eliza Darking of Bethnal Green, 27yo.

1884 – William Blumson (Post Office Directory)

1891 – William Blumson (Post Office Directory)

1891 – William Blumson of Spitalfields (Census) ... Blumson was 40yo and lived on site with his wife Lizzie Blumson of Manchester, 30yo, their eldest son William Blumson Jr, 19yo, who they employed as a barman, their three younger sons, John, 9yo, Alan, 7yo and Charlie, 4yo, their nephew Bertie Roberts of Dalston, 9yo, and two servants: William Miller of Stepney, 22yo, and (illegible first name) Bourne of Bury, 20yo.

1895 – William Blumson (Post Office Directory)

1899 – William Blumson (Post Office Directory)

1908 – Joseph Pailes (Post Office Directory)

1911 – Joseph Pailes of Southwark (Census) ... Pailes was 59yo and lived on site with his wife Caroline Pailes of Southwark, 58yo, four children Alfred, 26yo, Florrie, 22yo, Edward, 16yo and William, 8yo, and one servant: Louisa Johnson of London, 53yo.

1912 – Joseph Pailes (Post Office Directory)

1914 – Joseph Pailes (Post Office Directory)

1917 – Joseph Pailes (Post Office Directory)

1934 – A G Pailes (Kelly's Directory)

1944 – Copes Taverns (Post Office Directory)

References

External links
 

Grade II listed pubs in London
Spitalfields
Commercial Street, London
Pubs in the London Borough of Tower Hamlets
Grade II listed buildings in the London Borough of Tower Hamlets